The 2015–16 Kazakhstan Hockey Championship was the 24th season since the founding of the Kazakhstan Hockey Championship.

Teams

Regular season

Standings

Play-off

Quarterfinals

Arlan Kokshetau vs. HC Astana

Beibarys Atyrau vs. Gornyak Rudny

Kulager Petropavl vs. HC Temirtau

Nomad Astana vs. Yertis Pavlodar

Semi-finals

Arlan Kokshetau vs. Yertis Pavlodar

Beibarys Atyrau vs. Kulager Petropavl

Final

Arlan Kokshetau vs. Beibarys Atyrau

References

External links 
 Kazakhstan Ice Hockey Federation
 English language forum for the Kazakhstan Hockey Championship

Kazakhstan Hockey Championship seasons
Kazakhstan Hockey Championship
1